

Portugal
 Angola – António de Almeida, Governor of Angola (1749–53)
 Macau –
 Diogo Fernandes Salema e Saldanha, Governor of Macau (1749–52)
 D. Rodrigo de Castro, Governor of Macau (1752–55)

Colonial governors
Colonial governors
1752